David Michael Frank (born 21 December 1948) is an American composer, music arranger, and conductor, who has written musical scores for over 80 films and hundreds of primetime TV episodes, with four Emmy award nominations.

David Michael Frank was born in Baltimore, Maryland. He studied piano and composition at the Peabody Conservatory of Music and was soloist at the Peabody Orchestra since the age of 16. In 1978 he moved to California and since then he has become a prolific composer in various genres.

Michael Jackson, around the time of his death, worked with Frank on an album of classical music.

Awards and nominations
2009: Primetime Emmy Award nomination for  his theme for ABC's The Mole
1999: Primetime Emmy Award nomination for music in You Lucky Dog
1996: Primetime Emmy Award nomination for Outstanding Music Composition For A Miniseries, Movie Or A Special (Original Dramatic Score)  Annie: A Royal Adventure!
1990: Primetime Emmy Award nomination for Outstanding Music Direction - "Sammy Davis Jr. 60th Anniversary Celebration" (Outstanding Achievement in Music Direction)

External links
 David Michael Frank

References

Living people
American male composers
Musicians from Baltimore
21st-century American composers
1948 births
21st-century American male musicians